Herbert Gene Scheffler (November 5, 1917 – January 20, 2001) was an American professional basketball player. He played in the National Basketball League for the Detroit Gems in 1946–47. In 33 career games he averaged 3.8 points per contest.

Scheffler also played minor league baseball in 1940 for the Rocky Mount Red Sox in the Piedmont League. His manager was Hall of Famer Heinie Manush.

References 

1917 births
2001 deaths
American men's basketball players
Baseball players from Illinois
Basketball players from Illinois
Centers (basketball)
Detroit Gems players
Forwards (basketball)
High school basketball coaches in the United States
Illinois Fighting Illini baseball players
Illinois Fighting Illini men's basketball players
Oklahoma Sooners baseball players
Oklahoma Sooners men's basketball players
Rocky Mount Red Sox players
Sportspeople from Springfield, Illinois